Juberci Alves da Cruz, commonly known as Juba, is a Brazilian footballer who plays as a forward.

Juba has played in all four divisions of the Brazilian national football pyramid. He played one match for Goiás in 2015 Campeonato Brasileiro Série A, and represented Criciúma in 2015 Campeonato Brasileiro Série B and Boa Esporte in 2013 Campeonato Brasileiro Série B.

References

External links
 

Living people
1984 births
Brazilian footballers
Association football forwards
Clube Esportivo Aimoré players
Esporte Clube Flamengo players
Esporte Clube Novo Hamburgo players
Grêmio Esportivo Brasil players
Caxias Futebol Clube players
Esporte Clube São Luiz players
Boa Esporte Clube players
Veranópolis Esporte Clube Recreativo e Cultural players
Macaé Esporte Futebol Clube players
Operário Ferroviário Esporte Clube players
Criciúma Esporte Clube players
Goiás Esporte Clube players
Cuiabá Esporte Clube players
Grêmio de Esportes Maringá players
Campeonato Brasileiro Série A players
Campeonato Brasileiro Série B players
Campeonato Brasileiro Série C players
Campeonato Brasileiro Série D players
Sportspeople from Paraná (state)